Colleen Joyce Treen is a Canadian politician, who was elected to the Nova Scotia House of Assembly in the 2013 provincial election. A member of the Nova Scotia Liberal Party, she represented the electoral district of Cole Harbour-Eastern Passage until her defeat in the 2017 election.

Electoral record

|-
 
|Liberal
|Joyce Treen
|align="right"|3,057
|align="right"|40.62
|align="right"|
|-
 
|New Democratic Party
|Becky Kent
|align="right"|2,914
|align="right"|38.72
|align="right"|
|-
 
|Progressive Conservative
|Lloyd Jackson
|align="right"|1,555
|align="right"|20.66
|align="right"|

|}

References

External links
 Members of the Nova Scotia Legislative Assembly

Year of birth missing (living people)
Living people
Nova Scotia Liberal Party MLAs
People from the Halifax Regional Municipality
Women MLAs in Nova Scotia
21st-century Canadian politicians
21st-century Canadian women politicians